Arnold Matthias Brunckhorst (1670–1725) was a German organist and composer.

He was born in Celle or Wietzendorf. Beginning in 1693, he served as an organist at St. Andreas in Hildesheim. In 1697, he assumed the organist's post at the Stadtkirche in Celle. In 1720, he was appointed court organist at Hanover.

Works, editions and recordings
Only a few works by him have survived: two small oratorios - for Christmas and Easter, one single-movement keyboard sonata in A major (regarded as the earliest German documentation of the form of the two-part sonata structure, comparable to the formal type encountered in Domenico Scarlatti), and a praeludium in E minor for organ.

A "Präludium & Fuge" in g minor  - which was found not long ago in Berlin and was at first believed to be composed by Nikolaus Bruhns -  is now believed to be composed by Brunckhorst. However, due to at least one stylistic inconsistency in the fugue, it seems to be rather probable that - irrespective of the initial authorship of Brunckhorst or Bruhns -  this handwriting does not derive from the composer's own hand but some other, probably a scholar. A proposal for correction and supplements is available from me, Klaus Kleinhoff, Rodenberg, Germany.

Brunckhorst Opera omnia complete works: Weihnachts-Historie, Prelude for Organ in E minor. Oster-Historie, Harpsichord Sonata in A major. Musica Poetica Freiburg, dir. Hans Bergmann

References

Oxford Composer Companions, J.S. Bach, 1999, p. 74-75
Flamme, Friedhelm. (trans. Praeder, Susan Marie). Liner notes for CPO release 777 271-2

External links 

1670 births
1725 deaths
German classical organists
German male organists
German Baroque composers
18th-century keyboardists
18th-century classical composers
German classical composers
German male classical composers
People from Celle
18th-century German composers
18th-century German male musicians
Male classical organists